Bird Key is a barrier island in Sarasota Bay, south of the John Ringling Causeway, between mainland Sarasota and St. Armands Key. Originally a small barrier island connected to the Ringling Causeway by a tree lined causeway of its own, it was the home of John Ringling North, nephew of circus magnate John Ringling.

References

Unincorporated communities in Sarasota County, Florida
Islands of Sarasota County, Florida
Islands of Florida
Unincorporated communities in Florida